Malgassochaetus is a genus of beetles in the family Chaetosomatidae.

Species 
 Malgassochaetus cordicollis (Menier & Ekis, 1982)
 Malgassochaetus crowsoni Ekis & Menier, 1980 (type)
 Malgassochaetus descarpentriesi Ekis & Menier, 1980
 Malgassochaetus pauliani Ekis & Menier, 1980
 Malgassochaetus penicillatus Menier & Ekis, 1982
 Malgassochaetus quadraticollis (Menier & Ekis, 1982)
 Malgassochaetus sogai Menier, 1991
 Malgassochaetus viettei Menier & Ekis, 1982

References 

 

Chaetosomatidae
Cleroidea genera